Preto means "black" in Portuguese. Preto may also refer to:

Places
 Preto River (disambiguation)
 Rio Preto (disambiguation)
 Ouro Preto, a city in the state of Minas Gerais, Brazil
 Pinheiro Preto, a municipality in the state of Santa Catarina, Brazil
 Ribeirão Preto, a municipality in the state of São Paulo, Brazil

People

Francisco Rolão Preto (1893–1977), a Portuguese politician, journalist, and leader of the Movimento Nacional-Sindicalista
José Ramos Preto (1871–1949), a Portuguese jurist and politician
Preto (footballer, born 1978), Brazilian football defender born Marcos Antônio Costa
Preto (footballer, born 1981), Brazilian football forward born João Luiz Ferreira da Silva
Preto (footballer, born January 1986), Brazilian football goalkeeper born Celismar dos Santos Marins
Preto (footballer, born July 1986), Brazilian football forward born Jonathan Antenor de Moura Almeida

See also
 Alfrocheiro Preto, a red Portuguese wine grape variety 
 Pau Preto, a vernacular name for the tree Dalbergia retusa
 Afro-Brazilians, preto ("black") in Portuguese
 Sternarchogiton preto, a weakly electric knifefish species